Slab bridge, also called Ding Lu bridge, is located at the Feizu natural village in Feizu town in Luoyuan County, Fujian, China. It was built in the fifth year during the Xining period (1072) in the Song Dynasty. The bridge, which is haplopore, lies from east to west with 7 meters in length and 2.5 meters in width. There are some words engraved on the bridge that means it was built by various of people around the area.

Bridges in China